José Antonio Hermida Ramos (born August 24, 1978 in Puigcerdà, Girona) is a Spanish cyclist of Galician origin specializing in competitive mountain biking. He won the silver medal at the 2004 Summer Olympics in Athens, Greece after having finished in fourth place in the 2000 Summer Olympics.

Career highlights

1996
 1st in UCI Junior World Cross-country Championships,
2000
 1st in UCI Under-23 World Cross-country Championships,
 3rd in Houffalize, Mountainbike (BEL)
2001
 2nd in UCI World Cup Cross Country, Mountainbike
 1st in Napa Valley, Mountainbike (USA)
 3rd in Houffalize, Mountainbike (BEL)
2002
 1st in European Championship, Mountainbike, Elite
2003
 2nd in Grouse Mountainke, Mountainbike (CAN)
2004
 1st in European Championship, Mountainbike, Elite
 3rd in World Cup, Mountainbike
 3rd in Schladming, Mountainbike (AUT)
 3rd in Mont Sainte-Anne, Mountainbike (CAN)
 2nd in Olympic Games Cross-Country, Mountainbike, Athene
2005
 2nd in UCI World Cup Cross Country, Mountainbike
 2nd in Madrid, Mountainbike (ESP)
 3rd in Houffalize, Mountainbike (BEL)
 1st in Balneario Camboriu, Mountainbike (BRA)
 3rd in World Championship, Mountainbike XC Elite, Livigno
2006
 2nd in Spa-Francorchamps, Mountainbike (BEL)
 2nd in Fort William, Mountainbike (GBR)
 3nd in UCI World Cup Cross Country, Mountainbike
2007
 1st in National Cyclo-cross Championship, Elite, Spain, Alcobendas (ESP)
 1st in Houffalize, Mountainbike (BEL)
 2nd in Mont Sainte-Anne, Mountainbike (CAN)
 2nd in Saint Félicien, Mountainbike (CAN)
 1st in European Championship, Mountainbike, Elite, Cappadocia (TUR)
 2nd in UCI World Cup Cross Country, Mountainbike
2008
 1st in National Cyclo-cross Championship, Elite, Spain, Alcobendas (ESP)
 2nd in Ispaster, Cyclo-cross (ESP)
 3rd in UCI World Cup Cross Country, Mountainbike
 10th in Olympic Games Cross-country, Mountain Bike, Beijing

2009
 2nd in UCI World Cup Cross Country, Mountainbike
2010
 1st in UCI World Cross-country Championships, Mont Sainte-Anne (CAN)
2012
4th in Olympic Games Cross-country, Mountain Bike, London

References
 Spanish Olympic Committee
 

1978 births
Living people
Spanish male cyclists
Cross-country mountain bikers
Cyclo-cross cyclists
Cyclists at the 2000 Summer Olympics
Cyclists at the 2004 Summer Olympics
Cyclists at the 2008 Summer Olympics
Cyclists at the 2012 Summer Olympics
Cyclists at the 2016 Summer Olympics
Olympic cyclists of Spain
Olympic silver medalists for Spain
Olympic medalists in cycling
People from Cerdanya (comarca)
UCI Mountain Bike World Champions (men)
Cyclists at the 2015 European Games
European Games competitors for Spain
Medalists at the 2004 Summer Olympics
Cyclists from Catalonia
Spanish people of Galician descent
Sportspeople from the Province of Girona
21st-century Spanish people